Naravit Lertratkosum (Thai: ณราวิชญ์ เลิศรัตน์โกมุสภ์; born 1 February 2001) also known as Pond Naravit is a Thai actor under GMMTV. He began his career when he won the third edition of "Go On Girl & Guy Star Search" by Clean & Clear back in 2020, he then signed an exclusive contract with GMMTV.Pond gained popularity when he played Mork, one of the lead roles in the 2021 Thai comedy boys' love series, Fish upon the Sky.

Early life and education 
Naravit was born in the city of Bangkok in Thailand on February 1, 2001.  He is currently studying Biomedical Engineering, enrolled at the Faculty of Engineering, King Mongkut's Institute of Technology Ladkrabang. In 2019, during his early college days, Pond was named as the Most Handsome Man in the Faculty of Engineering and was a candidate for the Hot Student competition of the Ladkrabang Raja Mongkut Institute of Technology.

Career

2020-2021: Rising popularity, Fish Upon the Sky 
In 2020, Pond started his career when he won the third edition of Go On Girl & Guy Star Search by Clean & Clear. Following his win, he signed an exclusive contract with GMMTV in the same year. He first appeared on television when he played  Non, an extra role in the Science fantasy series The Gifted: Graduation.His part is aired every after each episodes, as part of the promotion for Clean & Clear.

In 2021, he has taken on his first lead role in the Thai comedy series Fish upon the Sky when he played Mork. This series skyrocketed his career in the industry.

2022-Present: Never Let Me Go 
During the GMMTV 2022: BORDERLESS event in the last part of 2021, it was announced that Pond will play the role of Palm in "Never Let Me Go", an upcoming mafia themed series produced by GMMTV,  together with Phuwin as his love interest and Chimon as his love rival. This is his second lead role after award winning series, Fish Upon the Sky.  He was also part of the upcoming GMMTV series Oops! Mr. Superstar Hit on Me, and Dirty Laundry.

In the KAZZ Awards 2022, Pond was named as Rising Male Actor of the Year, for his performance on Fish Upon the Sky.

Works

Filmography

Television

Hosting

Discography

Live performances

Awards and nominations

External links 
 
 Pond Naravit on Instagram
 Pond Naravit on Twitter

References 

Naravit Lertratkosum
Naravit Lertratkosum
Naravit Lertratkosum
2001 births
Living people